Since the invention of the trolleybus, well over 200 different makers of trolleybuses have existed. This is a list of trolleybus manufacturers, both current and former.

Current

Astra Bus, Romania
Belkommunmash, Belarus
Bogdan, Ukraine
Bozankaya, Turkey
CAIO InduscarPT, Brazil
Chongjin Bus Factory, North Korea
DINA, Mexico
Dongfeng Yangtse, China
Ekova Electric, Czech Republic
Electron Corporation, Ukraine
Eletra IndustrialPT, Brazil
Etalon, Ukraine
Foton Motor, China
Fiat Group, Italy
Iveco
Irisbus (with electrical equipment by Škoda)
Gillig, United States
Hamhung bus repair plant, North Korea
Hess, Switzerland
Kiepe Electric, Germany – electrical equipment only with Gillig, United States, as subcontractor for bodies and chassis
MAZ, Belarus
New Flyer Industries or Flyer Industries, Canada/USA
PC Transport Systems, Russia
Pyongsong bus repair plant, North Korea
Pyongyang Trolleybus Factory, North Korea
Škoda Electric, Czech Republic - electric drive equipment only with various bus builders as subcontractor for bodies and chassis
Solaris Bus & Coach (with electrical equipment by Škoda, DP Ostrava, Cegelec, Vossloh-Kiepe and Medcom), Poland
SOR Libchavy (with electrical equipment by Škoda), Czech Republic
Sunwin, China
Trans-Alfa (VMZ), Russia
Ursus, Poland
Ufa Tram and Trolleybus Plant (UTTZ), formerly Bashkir Trolleybus Plant (BTZ), Russia
Van Hool, Belgium
Youngman, China
YuMZ - Dnipro, Ukraine
Yutong, China
Zhongtong Bus, China

Former

4 June Rolling Stock Works, North Korea (no longer builds trolleybuses)
Alfa Romeo, Italy
Almatyelectrotrans-Service, formerly Electromash (Kazakhstan)
Amber, Lithuania
AM General, USA
AnsaldoBreda and predecessors Ansaldo Trasporti and Breda Costruzioni Ferroviarie, Italy
Aviant Aircraft Factory, Kyiv, Ukraine
Associated Equipment Company, UK
Berkhof (known as VDL Berkhof in its last years), Netherlands
Berna, Switzerland
BredaMenarinibus and predecessor Breda Costruzioni Ferroviarie, Italy
British United Traction, UK
Brown Boveri & Company (using GM New Look bus body) for Edmonton, Canada
Busscar, Brazil
Canadian Car and Foundry, Canada
Chavdar, Bulgaria
Crossley Motors, UK
Daimler Motor Company, UK
Dennis Specialist Vehicles, UK
DesignLine, New Zealand
ELBO, Greece
Electric Transit, Inc., USA-based joint venture
Fiat, Italy
FBW, Switzerland
Gräf & Stift, Austria
Guy Motors, UK
Henschel, Germany
Hispano-Suiza, Spain
Ikarus, Hungary
J.G. Brill, USA
Jelcz, Poland
Kawasaki (Japan)
Lancia, Italy
Leyland Motors, UK
LiAZ, Russia
LuAZ, Ukraine	
LAZ, Ukraine	
MAN, Germany
Mafersa, Brazil
Marmon-Herrington, USA
Materfer, Argentina
Menarini, Italy – acquired by Breda in 1989, forming BredaMenarinibus
Mercedes-Benz, Germany
MASA (Mexicana de Autobuses SA) – now part of Volvo, Mexico
 Moscow Trolleybus Plant (MTRZ), Russia
NAW, Switzerland
Neoplan, Germany
Neoplan USA
Pegaso, Spain
PTMZ, Russia
Praga, Czech Republic
Pullman-Standard, USA
Ransomes, Sims & Jefferies, UK
Richard Garrett & Sons, UK
Rocar, Romania
Saurer, Switzerland
Salvador Caetano, Portugal
St. Louis Car Company, USA
Scania AB, Sweden
Socimi, Italy
Sunbeam, UK
Tatra, Czech Republic
Trolza (previously ZiU), Russia
Tushino Mechanical Plant, Russia
Twin Coach, USA
Valmet, Finland
Vétra, France
Viseon Bus (formerly Neoplan's trolleybus production), Germany 
Volgograd transport and machinery plant, Russia
Volvo Buses, Sweden
Yaroslavl motor plant, Russia

References

 
Trolleybus manufacturers
Trolleybuses